Al-Mansur (714–775) was the second Abbasid caliph of Arab caliphate, ruling from 754 until his death in 775.

Al-Mansur, an Arabic surname meaning the Victorious, may also refer to:

People
 Mansur ibn Yazid ibn Mansur al-Himyari, Abbasid official and Provincial governor
 Mansur ibn Muhammad al-Mahdi, the son of Abbasid caliph Al-Mahdi (r. 775–785)
 Al-Mansur bi-Nasr Allah (913-953), Ruler and Ismaili Shia Imam of the Fatimids in Ifriqiya
 Al-Mansur ibn Buluggin (died 995), second ruler of the Zirids in Ifriqiya
 Al-Rashid Billah also known as Mansur, the Caliph of Baghdad during later Abbasid era
 Al-Mustansir I also known as Mansur, was the penultimate caliph of Baghdad
 Al-Mansur Ibn Abi Aamir or Almanzor (circa 938-1002), de facto ruler of Muslim Al-Andalus
 Mansur ibn Nasir (died 1104), Hammadid ruler
 Abu Yusuf Yaqub al-Mansur (circa 1160-1199), third Almohad ruler
 Abu Yusuf Yaqub ibn Abd Al-Haqq or Al Mansur Al Marini (1212-1286), founder of Marinid dynasty
 Al-Mansur of Tidore (c. 1475-1526), second sultan of Tidore, Maluku
 Ahmad al-Mansur (1549-1603), Sultan of the Saadi dynasty

Other uses
 Mansour district, a district in Baghdad, Iraq
Mansour neighbourhood
 Al Mansoura (Doha), a district in Qatar, located in the municipality of Ad Dawhah
 Mansoura, Egypt, a city in Arab Republic of Egypt
 Mansura, Sindh, or Brahmanabad, the historic capital of the Muslim Caliphate in Sindh, Pakistan

See also
 Almansor, an 1821 play by German poet and playwright Heinrich Heine